Nicholas Fish was an American Revolutionary War soldier.

Nicholas Fish may also refer to:

Nicholas Fish II (1846–1902), grandson of the soldier
Nicholas Fish (MP) (died 1558), English politician
Cola Pesce, an Italian folktale